The 2017–18 Plunket Shield was the 89th season of the Plunket Shield, the domestic first-class cricket competition in New Zealand. The competition started on 23 October 2017 and finished on 5 April 2018. Canterbury were the defending champions.

The round eight fixture between Canterbury and Auckland at the Mainpower Oval in Rangiora was called off due to an unsafe pitch. The umpires abandoned the game after only three balls were bowled on day three of the match.

Central Districts won the tournament, following the final round of fixtures, after their nearest rivals, Wellington, failed to win their last match.

Points table

 Winner

Fixtures

Round 1

Round 2

Round 3

Round 4

Round 5

Round 6

Round 7

Round 8

Round 9

Round 10

References

External links
 Series home at ESPN Cricinfo

Plunket Shield
2017–18 New Zealand cricket season
Plunket Shield